Donald Yukio Yamamoto (born 1953) is an American diplomat who served as the United States ambassador to Somalia from 2018 to 2021. Before that he was the acting assistant secretary of state for african affairs with a term of appointment starting September 3, 2017 until July 23, 2018. Yamamoto previously served as the senior vice president of International Programs and Outreach at the National Defense University from 2016 to 2017. Prior to that, he was senior advisor to the Director General of the Foreign Service on personnel reform from 2015 to 2016; he served as Chargé d'Affaires at the U.S. Mission Somalia office in Mogadishu in 2016; and in senior positions in Kabul, Mazar e-Sharif, and Bagram, Afghanistan from 2014 to 2015.

He was the former acting assistant secretary of state for african affairs from March 30, 2013 to August 5, 2013, U.S. ambassador to Ethiopia  from 2006 to 2009 and principal deputy assistant secretary within the Bureau of African Affairs. He was appointed by President George W. Bush in November 2006 and presented his credentials to Ethiopian Prime Minister Meles Zenawi in Addis Ababa on December 6, 2006. He was formerly the U.S. ambassador to Djibouti from 2000 to 2003 and chargé d’affaires ad interim for Eritrea from 1997 to 1998.

Early life and education
Yamamoto was born in Seattle, Washington to a Japanese immigrant father and a Nisei mother. Yamamoto later graduated from Columbia College of Columbia University in 1975 and School of International and Public Affairs, Columbia University in 1978.

Yamamoto entered the United States Foreign Service in 1980, serving primarily in Africa, with assignments in the Middle East and Asia , including U.S. Embassy Beijing (as staff aide to the Ambassador and Human Rights Officer during the Tiananmen Square demonstrations in 1989), and U.S. Consulate Fukuoka (as Principal Officer, 1992-1995). He received a master's degree from the National War College in 1996 and worked on Capitol Hill on a Congressional Fellowship in 1991.

He is the recipient of a Presidential Distinguished Service Award, Presidential Meritorious Service Award, Secretary's Distinguished Honor Award, over a dozen Senior Performance Awards, the State Department's 2006 Robert Frasure Memorial Award for advancing conflict resolution in Africa, and numerous other awards. He is also one of the youngest diplomats to be promoted to the rank of Career Minister.

Diplomatic career

U.S.-Chadian relations
From April 22–23, 2006, Yamamoto met with current Chadian President Idriss Déby to discuss Chad's dispute with the World Bank over allocation of its petroleum funds and the possibility of a U.S.-led, United Nations-monitored peace keeping force to end the Chadian-Sudanese conflict.

The Government of Chad repeatedly accused the Government of Sudan of complicity in United Front for Democratic Change incursions from Darfur into eastern Chad. Yamamoto is the first official in any government outside of Chad to repeat this claim, saying, "It is evident that there was safe haven and logistical support provided to rebel groups."

Chad produces around 100,000 bpd (barrels of oil per day, 2013 figures) which travels through the Chad-Cameroon pipeline, owned and operated by US companies ExxonMobil and Chevron and Malaysian Petronas. The Déby administration threatened to cut off the supply of oil at the end of April if the international community did not intervene to end the rebellion or if Exxon Mobil did not pay the government $100 million.
The dispute was later resolved, and Chad's oil continues to flow to other countries.

Chadian-Sudanese conflict

Yamamoto tried unsuccessfully to convince President Déby to delay the upcoming presidential election which was held on May 3. He later said, "We held a very direct and private discussion on the issue [of whether to postpone the election]... When people say that it's too late to delay an election... it's never too late to do anything. We must focus on what is important... to have a process in place and actual ability of all the people to participate in the process. Any election that doesn't have full participation of all groups then raises issues that they would have to answer for."

U.S.-Ethiopian relations

Yamamoto met with Ethiopian Prime Minister Meles Zenawi on April 22, 2006, to discuss the ongoing process of democratization in Ethiopia and the Ethio-Eritrea boundary dispute. Both leaders were positive about the outcome of the meeting. In 2021 a widely circulated video showed Yamamato consulting with a TPLF representative on TPLF's military operation to overthrow the Ethiopian government.

Assistant secretary of state
Yamamoto became acting assistant secretary of state for african affairs on March 30, 2013, replacing Johnnie Carson.

U.S. ambassador to Somalia
On 14 July 2018, President Donald Trump nominated Donald Yamamoto as the United States ambassador to Somalia. Yamamoto was subsequently confirmed for the position on 19 October 2018. While the US Mission to Somalia is based on the grounds of the US Embassy in Nairobi, Kenya, a permanent diplomatic mission was established in Mogadishu in December 2018.

Personal life
Yamamoto speaks Japanese, Chinese and French.

References

External links

1953 births
Living people
Ambassadors of the United States to Somalia
Ambassadors of the United States to Ethiopia
American politicians of Japanese descent
2006 in Chad
People from Seattle
School of International and Public Affairs, Columbia University alumni
Columbia College (New York) alumni
United States Foreign Service personnel
20th-century American diplomats
21st-century American diplomats
Asian conservatism in the United States